Tomáš Zatloukal (born August 3, 1969 in Gottwaldov, Czechoslovakia) is a Czech politician and former Member of the European Parliament with the Union of Independents, part of the European People's Party and sat on the European Parliament's Committee on Culture and Education.

He was a substitute for the Committee on Budgets and a member of the Delegation to the EU-Kazakhstan, EU-Kyrgyzstan and EU-Uzbekistan Parliamentary Cooperation Committees, and for relations with Tajikistan, Turkmenistan and Mongolia.

Education
 1992: Master's degree

Career
 1993-1998: Teacher
 since 1998: Secondary school headmaster
 2002: Member of Napajedla Town Council and member of Napajedla Town Board

See also
2004 European Parliament election in the Czech Republic

External links
 
 
 

1969 births
Living people
Politicians from Zlín
SNK Union of Independents MEPs
MEPs for the Czech Republic 2004–2009
Palacký University Olomouc alumni